Bryan Nauleau (born 13 March 1988 in Les Sables-d'Olonne) is a French cyclist, who currently rides for French amateur team Les Sables Vendée Cyclisme. He was named in the start list for the 2015 Tour de France.

Major results

2006
 2nd  Team pursuit, UEC European Junior Track Championships
2008
 8th Chrono des Nations U23
2009
 1st  Team pursuit, National Track Championships
2011
 3rd Grand Prix Cristal Energie
2013
 6th Overall Tour de Bretagne
2015
 9th Boucles de l'Aulne
2016
 7th Overall Tour de Savoie Mont-Blanc
 8th Overall La Tropicale Amissa Bongo

Grand Tour general classification results timeline

References

External links

1988 births
Living people
French male cyclists
People from Les Sables-d'Olonne
Sportspeople from Vendée
Cyclists from Pays de la Loire